Aulacodes is a genus of moths of the family Crambidae. The genus was first described by Achille Guenée in 1854.

Species
Aulacodes adiantealis (Walker, 1859)
Aulacodes adjutrealis Schaus, 1924
Aulacodes aechmialis Guenée, 1854
Aulacodes bipunctalis Kenrick, 1907
Aulacodes briocusalis (Schaus, 1924)
Aulacodes caepiosalis (Walker, 1859)
Aulacodes cervinalis (Hampson, 1897)
Aulacodes chalcialis (Hampson, 1906)
Aulacodes chionostola (Hampson, 1917)
Aulacodes cilianalis (Schaus, 1924)
Aulacodes citronalis (Druce, 1896)
Aulacodes confusalis Schaus, 1906
Aulacodes congallalis Schaus, 1924
Aulacodes convoluta Hampson, 1897
Aulacodes cuprescens (Hampson, 1912)
Aulacodes delicata Schaus, 1912
Aulacodes exhibitalis (Walker, 1862)
Aulacodes filigeralis (Walker, 1866)
Aulacodes fragmentalis (Lederer, 1863)
Aulacodes gothicalis (C. Felder, R. Felder & Rogenhofer, 1875)
Aulacodes halitalis (C. Felder, R. Felder & Rogenhofer, 1875)
Aulacodes hodevalis (Druce, 1896)
Aulacodes ilialis (Walker, 1859)
Aulacodes julittalis Schaus, 1924
Aulacodes lunalis Kenrick, 1907
Aulacodes melanicalis (Hampson, 1917)
Aulacodes mesoleucalis (Hampson, 1917)
Aulacodes methodica Meyrick, 1936
Aulacodes moralis Schaus, 1906
Aulacodes obtusalis Dyar, 1914
Aulacodes pampalis Schaus, 1906
Aulacodes peribocalis (Walker, 1859)
Aulacodes pulchralis (Rothschild, 1915)
Aulacodes purpurealis Kenrick, 1907
Aulacodes psyllalis (Guenée, 1854)
Aulacodes pulcherialis (Druce, 1896)
Aulacodes reversalis Dyar, 1914
Aulacodes scaralis (Schaus, 1906)
Aulacodes semicircularis Hampson, 1897
Aulacodes templalis Schaus, 1906
Aulacodes traversalis Dyar, 1914
Aulacodes trigonalis (Hampson, 1906)

Former species
Aulacodes hamalis Snellen, 1875

Furthermore, "A." eupselias was erroneously assigned to this genus at first; it is actually not very closely related by grass moth standards and nowadays placed in the monotypic genus Marasmianympha.

References

Acentropinae
Crambidae genera
Taxa named by Achille Guenée